The 1996–97 Nationale 1A season was the 76th season of the Nationale 1A, the top level of ice hockey in France. Eight teams participated in the league, and Albatros de Brest won their second league title. Club des Sports de Megève, Gap Hockey Club, and Image Club d'Epinal were relegated to the Nationale 1B.

First round

Second round

Final round

Qualification round

Playoffs

Relegation round

External links
Season on hockeyarchives.info

France
1996–97 in French ice hockey
Ligue Magnus seasons